Don't Go Breaking My Heart is a 1999 British film, starring Anthony Edwards, Jenny Seagrove and Charles Dance. It was directed by Willi Patterson.

Plot
Suzanne, a beautiful widow, has to choose between Frank, a philandering dentist, and Tony, a sensitive, failing sports trainer who helps her son.

Cast
 Anthony Edwards as Tony
 Jenny Seagrove as Suzanne
 Charles Dance as Frank

Production Notes
Dr. Fiedler played by Tom Conti is a parody of Dr Fassbender played by Peter Sellers in the movie What's New Pussycat?.

Bill Kenwright had to mortgage his own £1 million London home to pay for its production. Geoff Morrow who wrote the screenplay also wrote the 1977-hit Can't Smile Without You. Despite being second billed, Linford Christie only makes a short cameo appearance in the pre-credit scene of the film.

Reception
Julianne Pidduck from Sight & Sound praised several aspects of the film, however she concluded: " But despite all efforts, an uninspired script and uneven direction fail to make Suzanne's unhappy lurches from mourning widow to tender lover plausible."

References

External links
 
 Don't Go Breaking My Heart at BFI

1999 films
British romantic comedy films
Films scored by Rolfe Kent
1990s English-language films
1990s British films